St. Bernard High School is a four-year coeducational Catholic high school located in Playa Del Rey, California, which is in the West Los Angeles area. The school is located next to the Los Angeles International Airport, across from Westchester High School.

The school's mission statement is "to send forth faith-filled, principled and knowledgeable young men and women by providing an exemplary college preparatory and an extra-curricular education, rooted in Roman Catholic tradition." The school was founded in 1957. It is located within the Roman Catholic Archdiocese of Los Angeles.

Events

Plans for St. Bernard High School were begun in 1955, in response to the need for high schools in the Westchester–Playa del Rey area. Classes were held for one year at the St. Anastasia School while the present campus was being completed. On December 4, 1957, a ceremony blessed the present site.

During the 2007 and 2008 school years, the school added new computers for teachers and students. In the 2008/09 school year, a state-of-the-art video production studio was added. An Academic Success Class was developed in 2008 to ensure academic achievement for students that seem to have fallen behind in their studies.  In the fall of 2008, Academic Coach training was provided to over 30 qualified juniors and seniors. The Academic Coaches work with students one-on-one and in teams during the Academic Success Class. In addition, teachers post assignments and syllabi on the school's online portal, allowing parents to access the site from any computer.

In June 2009, the school hired a new principal, Mike Alvarez, a former principal of St. John Bosco High School.

The 51st Graduation ceremony was held, on June 3, 2011 at The Cathedral of Our Lady of the Angels, in light of the Class of 1961's 50th class jubilee reunion. Seventy percent of St. Bernard's 2011 graduates were accepted to four-year universities, and ninety eight percent of the class went on to attend higher learning institutes.

Enrollment had doubled, greatly, from the 2010–2011 school year to the 2011–2012 school....Due to this increase, SBHS became a member of the LMU/LA: Family Of Schools.

In July 2012, the school announced the appointment of co-principal, Dr. Cynthia Hoepner, who will be Co-Principal of Operations. Co-Principal Mike Alvarez will be in charge of Advancement & Campus Ministry.

In the summer of 2013, Mike Alvarez resigned as co-principal making Dr. Cynthia Hoepner the school's first female principal bringing some much needed campus remodeling and upgrading such as changes to the school library, computer labs, hallways, front office/offices, and the installation of wifi.

Dr Patrick Lynch became principal in Fall of 2016.

Visual/performing arts
Dance Team/Class

Theatre arts class/club

Art class/club

Assemblies that consist of multiple performances.

2 Annual dance recitals per school year

1 Annual fall play per year

1 Annual spring musical per year

The school's fine-arts program regularly includes over 100 students.

Recent productions have included "Hairspray", "Annie", "Damn Yankees", "Guys and Dolls", "Once Upon A Mattress", "Grease", and "The Wiz".

Sports
In 1997, the girls' 4 × 100 metres relay team set the NFHS national high school record with a time of 44.70 while winning the CIF California State Meet. The record stood for seven years, until it was beaten by a team from Long Beach Polytechnic High School; it still ranks as the second-best performance in the event. That year, the girls' track team—led by Miesha Withers and sisters Malika and Miya Edmonson—finished half a point behind Long Beach Polytechnic for the overall state team title.

The girls' basketball team were the 2010 Division VI Southern Section CIF Champions. In the 2010–2011 season, both the boys' and girls' teams won the Southern California Regional Division V championship and were the State Runner-up of the Southern California State Championship under first time SBHS boys' coach, Reggie Morris Jr, and girls' coach, Bo Corona. In the 2011–2012 season, the boys' basketball team were 10–0 League Champions and the first time Division V Southern Section CIF Champions in 16 years under coach Reggie Morris.

St. Bernard was the 2011 Del Rey League Football Champions Varsity and JV – 10-1 Record Seasons under first time, SBHS head coach Larry Muno.

Due to the resignation of head football coach, Larry Muno and the subsequent transfer out of several of the Varsity football team members, St. Bernard did not host a Varsity Football team for the 2012 Season. St. Bernard did host a Junior Varsity team for the 2012 season under the replacement head coach Mr. John Bibb.

St. Bernard Boys Basketball won the 2015 CIF 5A Southern Section Championship.

Notable alumni

 Butch Hays, basketball player
 Kevin Chilton, astronaut
 Royce Clayton, baseball shortstop 
 John Craigie, folk singer
 Shireen Crutchfield, actor, model, and singer
 C.P DUBB, music producer
 Rick Famuyiwa, film director and writer
 Corey Gaines, basketball player and coach
 Joselio Hanson, football cornerback
 Rocky Hinds, football quarterback
 Jim Hughes, baseball pitcher
 Wyking Jones, basketball coach
 Sylvia Lopez, news presenter
 Tanjareen Martin, actor and radio personality
 Taylour Paige, actor and dancer
 Donald Penn, football offensive tackle
 Khris Riddick-Tynes, music producer and songwriter
 Gerard Robinson, Secretary of Education for the Commonwealth of Virginia
 Antonio Sabàto, Jr., actor and model
 Aaron White, playwright
 Jason Willis, football wide receiver
 DJ A-Tron, DJ and music producer

References

Educational institutions established in 1957
1957 establishments in California
Roman Catholic secondary schools in Los Angeles County, California
High schools in Los Angeles
Playa del Rey, Los Angeles